Paul Tanner may refer to:

J. Paul Tanner (born 1950), Academic Dean of the Arab Center for Biblical Studies
Paul Francis Tanner (1905–1994), American clergyman of the Roman Catholic Church who served as the seventh Bishop of St. Augustine, Florida from 1968 to 1979
Paul Tanner (1917–2013), American musician and a member of the Glenn Miller Orchestra